Leandro Samarone da Rosa Fernandes (born 26 June 1971), known as just Leandro Samarone, is a former Brazilian football player and manager.

Career
Born in Ribeira, São Paulo, Leandro Samarone began his career in Esporte Clube XV de Novembro's youth system. He played for Associação Atlética Ponte Preta before moving to Russia where he played eight years, including spells with PFC CSKA Moscow and FC Spartak Moscow.

After he retired from playing, Leandro Samarone became a football coach. He was the manager of União Agrícola Barbarense Futebol Clube until June 2005.

Honours
 Russian Premier League champion: 1998.
 Russian Premier League bronze: 2003 (with FC Rubin Kazan).
 Russian Cup winner: 2004 (played in the early stages of the 2003/04 tournament for FC Terek Grozny).

European club competitions
 UEFA Cup 1996–97 with PFC CSKA Moscow: 4 games.
 UEFA Intertoto Cup 1997 with FC Torpedo-Luzhniki Moscow: 4 games, 1 goal.
 UEFA Champions League 1998–99 with FC Spartak Moscow: 3 games, 1 goal.

References

External links

Profile at FC Spartak Moscow

1971 births
Living people
Brazilian footballers
Association football defenders
Brazilian football managers
Esporte Clube XV de Novembro (Piracicaba) players
Associação Atlética Ponte Preta players
Clube Atlético Bragantino players
Grêmio Foot-Ball Porto Alegrense players
Ituano FC players
PFC CSKA Moscow players
Vila Nova Futebol Clube players
FC Torpedo Moscow players
FC Torpedo-2 players
FC Spartak Moscow players
PFC Krylia Sovetov Samara players
FC Rubin Kazan players
FC Akhmat Grozny players
FC Arsenal Tula players
Brazilian expatriate footballers
Expatriate footballers in Russia
Russian Premier League players